Somdet Phra Bawornrajchao Maha Sura Singhanat (lit: His Royal Highness, Maharurasinghanat, Prince of Front Palace) (1 November 1744 – 3 November 1803) was the younger brother of Rama I, the first monarch of the Chakri dynasty of Siam. As an Ayutthayan general, he fought alongside his brother in various campaigns against Burmese invaders and the local warlords. When his brother crowned himself as the king of Siam at Bangkok in 1781, he was appointed the Front Palace or Maha Uparaj, the title of the heir. During the reign of his brother, he was known for his important role in the campaigns against Bodawpaya of Burma.

Early life
Bunma was born in 1744 to Thongdee and Daoreung. His father Thongdee was the Royal Secretary of Northern Siam and Keeper of Royal Seal. As a son of aristocrat, he entered the palace and began his aristocratic life as a royal page. Thongdee was a descendant of Kosa Pan, the leader of Siamese mission to France in the seventeenth century. Bunma had four other siblings and two other half-siblings. Bunma himself was the youngest born to Daoreung.

Campaigns against the Burmese

In 1767, Ayutthaya was about to fall. Bunma fled the city with a small carrack to join the rest of his family at Amphawa, Samut Songkram. His brother, the Luang Yokbat of Ratchaburi suggested that he should join Taksin's forces at Chonburi.

After the fall of Ayutthaya, the city and peripheral areas were under the control of the Burmese while local Siamese nobles established their own states. In 1768, Taksin recaptured Ayutthaya and repelled the Burmese. After the establishment of Thonburi and coronation of Taksin, Bunma was appointed Phra Maha Montri (Royal Police of the Right).

In the same year the two brothers joined the forces against the Lord of Phimai in the Isan region. After the campaign, he was raised to Phraya Anuchitraja. Anuchitraja waged several fightings to repel Burmese invasions. In 1770, after the defeat of Lord Fang, Anuchitraja became Chao Phraya Surasi - the ruler of Phitsanulok and defender of northern frontiers. In 1771, Surasi joined Phraya Pichai in his legendary fighting that broke his sword. Chao Phraya Surasi was known for his ruthlessness in wars that the Burmese gave him the epithet Tiger Lord. In 1774, Phraya Surasi and his brother were assigned the mission to capture Lanna from the Burmese. With the help of Prince Kawila of Lampang, the Siamese forces were able to take Chiang Mai. Surasi then took Kawila's sister, Sri Anocha, as his principal wife.

From 1771 to 1781, Surasi joined his brother in massive campaigns subjugating the Laotian kingdoms of Vientiane, Luang Prabang, and Champasak, and Cambodia. In 1781, Taksin went mad and a rebellion sprang out to depose the king. His brother, Somdet Chao Phraya Maha Kasatsuek returned to Bangkok to undo the rebellion. Maha Kasatsuek then crowned himself as Ramathibodi and moved the capital to the left bank of Chao Phraya river - modern Bangkok. Surasi, as Ramathibodi's right hand, was appointed the Front Palace or heir to the throne.

Maha Sura Singhanat pioneered the construction of the Front Palace.

Military campaigns
In July 1785, the Burmese king Bodawpaya launched the massive invasions of Siam in the Nine Armies War. Maha Sura Singhanat led the Siamese forces to receive the Burmese attacks coming from the west and south. He strategically defeated the superior Burmese armies at the Battle of Lat Ya and forced Bodawpaya to retreat. The next year, he led an army against the Burmese forces in the south and defeated them at the Battle of Chaiya. In the same year, Bodawpaya launched the Tha Din Daeng campaign. Maha Sura Singhanat managed to inflict a fatal blow on Burmese army and forced them to retreat.

In 1802, the Burmese invaded Lan Na. Rama I sent his brother to relieve the siege on Chiang Mai. However, Maha Sura Singhanat fell ill on the course of journey but dispatched his troops to Chiang Mai in substitution. Rama I, upon hearing about the illness of his brother, then sent his nephew Anurak Devesh the Rear Palace to take Chiang Mai, but the Front Palace forces took Chiang Mai beforehand and complained Royal Palace forces' inefficiency. This stirred the conflicts between militarymen of the two palaces.

Death

In 1803, Maha Sura Singhanat fell ill seriously. However, as recorded by Princess Kampushchat, Maha Sura Singhanat's daughter with his Cambodian concubine, the Front Palace officials blocked the Royal Palace forces from entering the Front Palace as Phutthayotfa Chulalok came to take care of his brother. Maha Sura Singhanat also expressed his will that the treasures of the Front Palace should be inherited only by his own descendants. Maha Sura Singhanat finally died in 1803.

References

Thai generals
Front Palaces
1743 births
1803 deaths
18th-century Thai women
18th-century Chakri dynasty
19th-century Thai women
19th-century Chakri dynasty
Rattanakosin Kingdom
Non-inheriting heirs presumptive